Andrew Augustus Lysaght (8 August 1873 – 3 May 1933) was an Australian politician. He was a Labor Party member of the New South Wales Legislative Assembly from 1925 until 1933, representing the electorate of Bulli. He served as Attorney-General of New South Wales under Jack Lang in 1927 and 1930-31.

Lysaght was born at Mount Ousley near Wollongong, the son of politician Andrew Lysaght, senior. He was educated in Wollongong before attending Newington College (1888–1890) and the University of Sydney. He undertook articles in 1891, and was admitted as a solicitor in 1896. He established a reputation as a leading industrial lawyer, practicing in both Sydney and Wollongong. He was elected to the North Illawarra Municipal Council from 1900 to 1902, serving as mayor in 1902. It was at this time that his most prominent moment as a lawyer occurred, representing the miners before the Royal Commission into the Mount Kembla mining disaster. He continued to hold a successful legal career, and in 1923 was called to the bar.

Lysaght entered state politics in 1925, when he defeated incumbent Nationalist Mark Morton for the final seat in multi-member Wollondilly. He was briefly appointed Attorney-General in 1927, during the last months of the Lang government. In 1927, following the abolition of the multi-member system, he contested and won the recreated seat of Illawarra, defeating sitting MLA Brian Doe.

A redistribution of the region in 1930 saw him contest and win the new seat of Bulli, and Lang's return to power saw him again appointed Attorney-General, despite lacking support within the Labor caucus. He clashed heavily with ideological rivals within Labor, and slowly lost Lang's support; he had also become increasingly irascible, associated with his declining health as a result of a disease of the nervous system. He resigned from the ministry in 1931, and though he was re-elected in 1932, he suffered from continually worsening health.

He died at Campbelltown in 1933 while still in office, and was buried in the small town of Appin.

References

 

1873 births
1933 deaths
Attorneys General of New South Wales
Australian barristers
Australian solicitors
Members of the New South Wales Legislative Assembly
Mayors of places in New South Wales
People educated at Newington College
University of Sydney alumni
Australian Labor Party members of the Parliament of New South Wales